Bar (also Romanized as Bār) is a city in Firuzeh Rural District, in the Central District of Firuzeh County, Razavi Khorasan Province, Iran. At the 2006 census, its population was 4,103, in 968 families. Its close major cities are Nishapur and Firouzeh. This city and Firouzeh used to be part of the county of Nishapur though now they have become part of a separated county. These cities are historically part of the Greater Region of the city of Nishapur and its people have daily commute and connections with each other. A dam located near this city is used one of the main water sources of the city of Nishapur.

Gallery

See also 

 List of cities, towns and villages in Razavi Khorasan Province

References 

Populated places in Firuzeh County
Cities in Razavi Khorasan Province